Mohamed Hegazy Abdul Mawgoud (born 11 November 1963) is a lieutenant general in the Egyptian Armed Forces who is the current commander of the Egyptian Air Defense Forces. Prior to his appointment as commander of Air Defense, he served as chief of the Air Defense until December 2020.

Biography 
Hegazy graduated from the Egyptian Air Defense Academy in 1986. He obtained MA with military science from the Command and Staff College. He also attended Nasser Military Academy where he obtained his military courses.

Awards 
 Long Service and Good Exemplary Medal (2)
 25th January Revolution Medal
Military Duty Decoration  First Class
 Excellent Service Decoration
 30th June Revolution Medal
 Sinai Liberation Silver Jubilee Medal
 January 25th Medal
 June 30th Medal
 Air Defense Forces Golden Jubilee Medal

References 

1963 births
Egyptian military leaders
Egyptian Military Academy alumni
Place of birth missing (living people)
Living people